Holy Family Convent, Bambalapitiya is a leading Catholic girls school in Colombo, Sri Lanka. It was established on 3 February 1903, by the nuns of the Holy Family Order of Bordeaux.

It provides primary and secondary education. The school currently  has around 3,500 students. The school is a non-fee levying school. School buildings covers and includes a fully equipped auditorium, ICT lab, Science lab, Chapel and Library.

History

The first principal was Rev. Mother Agnes Stouter. The school's chapel was completed in 1933. The school began as a small school for thirty students at "Clock House" down Laurie's Road. After shifting location several times, the school ended where it is now, down Retreat Road. During World War 2, the school building was used as a hospital.
Holy Family Convent Bambalapitiya celebrated its 110th anniversary on 2 February 2013. The school is also known as The Grand Old Lady by the Sea due to its proximity to the sea.

Chapel

The chapel of Holy Family Convent, Bambalapitiya was dedicated to the Holy Family of Nazareth in 1933. Funds to build it were collected through various sources. One of the main sources was the school's very own students. Concerts were organised and each class came forward to perform every Friday for which tickets were sold at the price of 10 cents.

The Carrara marble altar was a gift from the past pupils of that time and the tabernacle was a gift from Elizabeth Pillai. Holy Hour every first Friday afternoon of the month, annual retreats which went on for two or three days and confessions on Thursdays were the regular religious services that were held in the chapel.

Today, Holy Mass and special ceremonies such as Confirmation, Christmas Eve mass, the school Christmas carol service and First Holy Communion are held in this place of worship.

College anthem
The college anthem was composed by Eileen Walles and the words written by Wendy Whatmore.

Facilities

Auditorium 
ICT labs
Dancing halls
Large conference hall named "Green Hall"
Home economics room
Library
Multimedia rooms
Primary Hall
Primary play area
Science lab
Students' saving unit powered by HNB

Notable alumni

 Bernard Soysa - Sri Lankan politician
 Maureen Hingert - Actress; beauty pageant winner, 1955
 Visakha Wijeyeratne - Artist
 Sybil Wettasinghe - Children's author and illustrator
 Anusha Siriratne - Aviator
 Kasturi Chellaraja Wilson - Business magnate, financial expert
 Dinakshie Priyasad - Actress 
 Sheshadri Priyasad - Actres

External links
Official Website

Notable alumni

 Bernard Soysa - Sri Lankan politician
 Maureen Hingert - Actress; beauty pageant winner, 1955  
 Visakha Wijeyeratne - Artist
 Sybil Wettasinghe - Children's author and illustrator
 Anusha Siriratne - Aviator
 Kasturi Chellaraja Wilson - Business magnate, financial expert
 Dinakshie Priyasad - Actress 
 Sheshadri Priyasad - Actress

References

External links
Official Website

1903 establishments in Ceylon
Educational institutions established in 1903
Girls' schools in Sri Lanka
Private schools in Sri Lanka
Schools in Colombo